The 2009–10 Women's A Basketball League of Serbia is the 4th season of the First Women's Basketball League of Serbia, the highest professional basketball league in Serbia. It is also 66th national championship played by Serbian clubs inclusive of nation's previous incarnations as Yugoslavia and Serbia & Montenegro.

The first part of the season consists of 12 teams and 132-game regular season began on 8 October 2009 and will end on 21 March 2010. The second part of the season is the Play Off.

Regular season
The League part of the season was played with 12 teams and play a dual circuit system, each with each one game at home and away. The four best teams at the end of the regular season were placed in the Play Off. The regular season began on 8 October 2009 and it will end on 21 March 2010.

Play Off
Play Off is played according to the cup system. Champion is received after the final was played. In all parts of Play Off was played on 2 wins. Play Off is played from 5 to 24 April 2010.

Awards
Player of the Year: Dajana Butulija (175-G-86) of Partizan
Guard of the Year: Jovana Vukoje (174-G-86) of Voždovac
Forward of the Year: Dajana Butulija of Partizan
Center of the Year: Jelena Velinović (193-C-81) of Crvena zvezda
Newcomer of the Year: Marija Prlja (162-G-87) of Voždovac
Most Improved Player of the Year: Tijana Ajduković (197-C-91) of Spartak Subotica
Import Player of the Year: Saša Čađo (172-G-89) of Hemofarm
Domestic Player of the Year: Dajana Butulija of Partizan
Defensive Player of the Year: Marija Prlja of Partizan
Coach of the Year: Marina Maljković of Partizan

1st Team
Sheena Moore (170-G-84) of Partizan
Jovana Vukoje of Voždovac
Dajana Butulija of Partizan
Ivana Grubor (185-F/C-84) of Radivoj Korać
Jelena Velinović of Crvena zvezda

2nd Team
Marija Prlja of Voždovac
Biljana Stanković (176-G-74) of Hemofarm
Anja Stupar (178-F/C-89) of Vojvodina
Jelica Domazet (188-F/C-88) of Čelarevo
Tijana Ajduković of Spartak Subotica

Honorable Mention
Sanja Orozović (184-G-90) of Spartak Subotica
Iva Musulin (170-G-84) of Radivoj Korać
Tina Jovanović (191-F/C-91) of Radivoj Korać
Tamara Radočaj (168-G-87) of Hemofarm
Mirjana Beronja (170-G-86) of Partizan
Verica Stojiljković (166-G-79) of Radnički Kragujevac
Milica Kravić (180-F-85) of Proleter Zrenjanin
Maja Škorić (184-F-89) of Čelarevo

All-Domestic Players Team
Biljana Stanković of Hemofarm
Jovana Vukoje of Voždovac
Dajana Butulija of Partizan
Ivana Grubor of Radivoj Korać
Jelena Velinović of Crvena zvezda

All-Imports Team
Sheena Moore of Partizan
Maja Milutinović (177-G-87) of Hemofarm
Saša Čađo of Hemofarm
Anja Stupar of Vojvodina
Daliborka Vilipić (196-C-75) of Hemofarm

All Defensive Team
Marija Prlja of Voždovac
Dunja Prčić (180-G-87) of Partizan
Anja Stupar of Vojvodina
Marina Morača (180-F-85) of Čelarevo
Tijana Ajduković of Spartak Subotica

All-Newcomers Team
Marija Prlja of Voždovac
Milena Radošević (173-G/F-87) of Čelarevo
Nevena Jovanović (179-G-90) of Kovin, then she moved to Radivoj Korać
Ivana Jovanović (185-F/C-85) of Proleter Zrenjanin
Ivana Brajković (195-C-93) of Radivoj Korać

External links
 Women's A Basketball League of Serbia at eurobasket.com
 Regular season at srbijasport.net
 Play Off at srbijasport.net

First Women's Basketball League of Serbia seasons
Serbia
women